Les Misérables (stylized as LES MISERABLES) is a Japanese manga series by Takahiro Arai, based on Victor Hugo's novel of the same name. It was serialized in Shogakukan's shōnen manga magazine Monthly Shōnen Sunday from September 2013 to May 2016, with its chapters collected in eight tankōbon volumes.

Publication
Based on Victor Hugo's novel of the same name, s Les Misérables manga adaptation was serialized in Shogakukan's shōnen manga magazine Monthly Shōnen Sunday from September 12, 2013, to May 12, 2016. Shogakukan collected its chapters in eight tankōbon volumes, released from December 12, 2013, to July 12, 2016.

In February 2022, Seven Seas Entertainment announced that they licensed the series for English release in North America and will be released in a four-volume omnibus edition starting in December 13, 2022.

Volume list

References

Further reading

External links
  
 

Historical anime and manga
Seven Seas Entertainment titles
Shogakukan manga
Shōnen manga
Works based on Les Misérables